Euglossa villosa is a species of orchid bee in the genus Euglossa. It has been found in Mexico, Guatemala, Nicaragua, Costa Rica, and Panama.

Description 
It is a metallic green with a bronzy iridescence on the mesoscutum, metatibia, and metasoma.

References 

villosa
Orchid pollinators
Insects described in 1968